Schaeffer's sign is a clinical sign in which squeezing the Achilles tendon elicits an extensor plantar reflex. It is found in patients with pyramidal tract lesions, and is one of a number of Babinski-like responses.

The sign takes its name from the German neurologist Max Schaeffer (1852-1923).

References

External links 
 

Symptoms and signs: Nervous system
Reflexes